The men's regu sepak takraw competition at the 2018 Asian Games was held at Ranau Sports Hall, Palembang, Indonesia from 25 to 28 August 2018.

Squads

Results
All times are Western Indonesia Time (UTC+07:00)

Preliminary

Group A

|-

|-
|25 August||15:00
|align=right|
|align=center|2–0
|align=left|
|21–10||21–11||
|-

|-
|25 August||18:15
|align=right|
|align=center|2–0
|align=left|
|21–2||21–6||
|-

|-
|26 August||11:00
|align=right|
|align=center|2–0
|align=left|
|21–1||21–5||
|-

|-
|26 August||11:00
|align=right|
|align=center|2–1
|align=left|
|9–21||21–18||21–11
|-

|-
|27 August||10:00
|align=right|
|align=center|2–0
|align=left|
|21–10||21–6||
|-

|-
|27 August||10:00
|align=right|
|align=center|2–0
|align=left|
|21–5||21–16||
|-

|-

Group B

|-

|-
|25 August||14:00
|align=right|
|align=center|0–2
|align=left|
|1–21||2–21||
|-

|-
|25 August||14:00
|align=right|
|align=center|2–0
|align=left|
|21–6||21–6||
|-

|-
|25 August||17:00
|align=right|
|align=center|2–0
|align=left|
|21–4||21–2||
|-

|-
|26 August||10:00
|align=right|
|align=center|2–0
|align=left|
|21–13||21–4||
|-

|-
|26 August||10:00
|align=right|
|align=center|0–2
|align=left|
|13–21||20–22||
|-

|-
|26 August||13:00
|align=right|
|align=center|2–0
|align=left|
|21–4||21–9||
|-

|-
|26 August||13:00
|align=right|
|align=center|0–2
|align=left|
|21–23||15–21||
|-

|-
|26 August||16:00
|align=right|
|align=center|1–2
|align=left|
|21–19||17–21||9–21
|-

|-
|27 August||11:00
|align=right|
|align=center|0–2
|align=left|
|15–21||12–21||
|-

|-
|27 August||11:00
|align=right|
|align=center|2–0
|align=left|
|21–5||21–15||
|-

|-

Knockout round

Semifinals

|-
|27 August||15:00
|align=right|
|align=center|2–0
|align=left|
|21–19||21–16||
|-
|27 August||15:00
|align=right|
|align=center|2–0
|align=left|
|21–8||21–8||
|-

Gold medal match

|-
|28 August||10:00
|align=right|
|align=center|1–2
|align=left|
|21–18||20–22||11–21
|-

References

External links
Sepak takraw at the 2018 Asian Games

Sepak takraw at the 2018 Asian Games